Wannalancet may refer to:

A variant spelling of Wonalancet (ca. 1619-1697), a Native American leader
USS Wannlancet (YTB-385), a United States Navy harbor tug in commission from 1944 to 1946

See also
Wanaloset (disambiguation)